The 1984 United States Senate election in Georgia was held on November 6, 1984. Incumbent Democratic U.S. Senator Sam Nunn won re-election to a third term.

Major candidates

Democratic 
 Sam Nunn, incumbent Senator

Republican 
 Mike Hicks, educator

Results

See also 
 1984 United States Senate elections

References

1984
Georgia
1984 Georgia (U.S. state) elections